Caucasus University Association is an association of universities founded in 2009.

The members are in Azerbaijan, Georgia, Iran, Kazakhstan, Moldova, Northern Cyprus, Russia, Turkey, Ukraine and the United States.

List of members 
Ağrı İbrahim Çeçen University
Ahmet Yesevi University
Akdeniz University
Aksaray University
Anadolu University
Ardahan University
Artvin Çoruh University
Atatürk University
Azerbaijan Architecture and Construction University
Azerbaijan Medical University
Azerbaijan National Academy of Sciences
Azerbaijan State Oil Academy
Baku Eurasian University
Baku Slavic University
Baku State University
Bayburt University
Beykent University
Bingöl University
Bitlis Eren University
Bozok University
Bülent Ecevit University
Çankaya University
Khazar University
Comrat State University
Cumhuriyet University
Düzce University
Eastern Mediterranean University
Erzincan University
Erzurum Technical University
Eskişehir Osmangazi University
Fırat University
Ganja State University
Giresun University
Girne American University
Iğdır University
Istanbul Kültür University
Izmir Kâtip Çelebi University
Kafkas University
Karabük University
Karadeniz Technical University
Kastamonu University
Kilis 7 Aralık University
Maltepe University
Mustafa Kemal University
Nakhchivan State University
Nevşehir Hacı Bektaş Veli University
Niğde University
Ordu University
Qafqaz University
Recep Tayyip Erdoğan University
Sumqayit State University
University of Tabriz
University of the Incarnate Word, San Antonio, Texas, United States
Uşak University
Yıldırım Beyazıt University
Yıldız Technical University

References

External links 
Official website 

University associations and consortia
Organizations established in 2009
College and university associations and consortia in Europe